Ikeleng'i is a constituency of the National Assembly of Zambia. It covers the towns of Ikeleng'i and Kalene Hill in North-Western Province.

The constituency was established in 1973 as Mwinilunga West, and was renamed Ikeleng'i in 2011 after the establishment of Ikelenge District.

List of MPs

References

Constituencies of the National Assembly of Zambia
1973 establishments in Zambia
Constituencies established in 1973